The 2010 Louisville Cardinals football team represented the University of Louisville in the 2010 NCAA Division I FBS football season. The Cardinals were led by head coach Charlie Strong, who was in his first season. They played their home games at Papa John's Cardinal Stadium and were members of the Big East Conference. They finished the season 7–6, 3–4 in Big East play and were invited to the Beef 'O' Brady's Bowl, where they defeated Southern Miss, 31–28.

Schedule

References

Louisville
Louisville Cardinals football seasons
Gasparilla Bowl champion seasons
Louisville Cardinals football